Carried Me: The Worship Project is the third studio album from contemporary Christian musician Jeremy Camp. It was released on February 10, 2004, and entered the Billboard 200 at #102.

Track listing 
 "I Will Trust in You" (Danny Daniels) – 3:40
 "Beautiful One" (Tim Hughes) – 3:57
 "Enough" (Chris Tomlin, Louie Giglio) – 3:57
 "Wonderful Maker" (Tomlin, Matt Redman) – 4:28
 "Hear My Voice" (Camp) – 3:49
 "I Wait for the Lord" (Scott Cunningham) – 3:31
 "Empty Me" (John Mark Comer, Gene Way)  – 3:37
 "I Surrender to You" (Adam Watts, Gannin Arnold, Andy Dodd)  – 4:12
 "Walk By Faith" (Camp)  – 3:58
 "Revive Me" (Camp) – 3:26
 "You're Worthy of My Praise" (David Ruis)  – 3:49
 "Longing Heart" (Camp) – 4:12
 "Carried Me" (Camp, Watts, Dodd) – 4:08

Personnel
 Tracks #1, 3, 5-13 Produced & Engineered by Adam Watts & Andy Dodd at Red Decibel Studios (Mission Viejo, CA).
 Tracks #2 & 4 Produced by Steve Hindalong & Marc Byrd; Engineered by Derri Daugherty & Jordan Richter at The Sound Kitchen (Franklin, TN) and Roswell East (Nashville, TN).
 Tracks #1, 5, 6, 7, 9-13 mixed by JR McNeely at The Castle (Franklin, TN); Tracks #3 & 8 mixed at Compound Studios (Seattle, WA).
 Tracks #2 & 4 mixed by Tom Laune at Bridgeway Studio (Franklin, TN).
 Mastered by Brian Gardner at Bernie Grundman Mastering (Hollywood, CA).
 Executive Producer: Brandon Ebel
 Management: Flat Out Entertainment/Matt Balm
 Art Direction and Design: Asterik Studio, Seattle.
 Photography: Matthew Barnes

References 

Jeremy Camp albums
BEC Recordings albums
2004 albums